Gem Constituency is an electoral constituency in Kenya. It is one of six constituencies of Siaya County. The constituency was established for the 1963 elections.

Members of Parliament

County Assembly Wards

References 

Constituencies in Siaya County
Constituencies in Nyanza Province
1963 establishments in Kenya
Constituencies established in 1963